Elizio, aka Mister ODC (Original Di Cabo Verde) is a singer-songwriter born in Angola in 1979, of Cape Verdean origin.
Revealed with the title 10 fois, 100 fois featuring Perle Lama in 2003, Elizio quickly meets his first big solo success with Melodia which leads him to the top of the zouk scene. The artist then connects the tubes and expands his musical universe with more than 70 titles, ranging from general dancefloor with sounds like Bad Man on Kizomba with Angel or Make love on tempo in particular, through the kuduro as Sabi Di Mas.

Biography
Fleeing the massacres of the civil war in Angola, Elizio arrives in France with his mother at the age of 2 years. He goes to university in Paris, to become a sport teacher. His passion for hip hop eventually led quickly into the musical world.
In 2001, it occurs on Ragga, hip hop scenes in Paris and in the provinces. His encounter with the artist Kaysha is the beginning of his career as a songwriter and performer.

Early career
In 2002 he writes and raises his voice on the albums of the biggest names in African Caribbean scene as Kaysha and Soumia.
That same year, the artist Passi offers him to participate in the compilation Dis l'heure de zouk which became a double gold disc with the title Laisse parler les gens.

First solo album
In October 2003 Elizio, released his first solo album Original Di Cabo Verde.
The title 10 fois, 100 fois featuring Perle Lama remains six months number 1 ranking in the Afro-Caribbean and is rewarded best duo in 2004 by Dynamitch d'Or.
Songs Melodia, Amor (featuring Princess Lover) and Chupa (featuring Kaysha) on the same album also have a lot of success and allow him to become famous. He then toured in more than fifteen countries from Europe to Africa through the United States.

Rise
In June 2005, is his second album Carpe Diem realised. Songs Carpe Diem featuring Lynnsha, Tu n'oublieras jamais with Priscilla and Ne me laisse pas are consistent success.
A few years later, Elizio created his own label Dolce Melody.
In March 2008, the third album, Confirmação is released in a limited edition CD / DVD. It also meets several hits including Bonita, Make Love on tempo, Plus loin, plus haut and the Kuduro song Sabi di mas.
This album is the most sold album in 2009 on the Portuguese speaking and African market.
It is also nominated for Kora Music Awards this year with the title Make love on tempo.

Today, Elizio's videos on YouTube totaling more than 16 million views without any national record company.

Musical style
Born on the zouk scene, the artist Elizio has won a wide audience through his original music that combines different musical styles, mixing urban rhythms, pop, Afro-Caribbean and electro. As a real showman on stage, he leads the dance from all walks of generalist kizomba, through kuduro.

Discography
 October 2003: Original di Cabo Verde
 June 2005: Carpe Diem
 March 2008: Confirmação
 December 2010: I'm Back
 August 2015 : Lindissima – Single

Records and awards

Collaborations
 Kaysha
 Passi
 Lynnsha
 Ali Angel
 Perle Lama
 Princess Lover
 Kim
 Talina
 Manu Key
 Ludo
 Nichol's
 Mika Mendes
 Celia
 Maryza
 Nelson Freitas
 Johnny Ramos
 Mark G
 Gil Semedo

References

External links
  Elizio Official Youtube Channel
 Sushiraw Ultra Digital
 Discography

1979 births
Living people
People from Luanda
English-language singers
French-language singers
21st-century Angolan male singers
21st-century Cape Verdean male singers
Angolan people of Cape Verdean descent
Angolan emigrants to France